CARe Medical College (CAReMC) is a private medical school in Asad Gate, Mohammadpur, Dhaka, Bangladesh. CAReMC was established in 2014. The college grew out of CARe Specialized Hospital. The name CARe stands for Center for Assisted Reproduction. 

As of 2022, the degree awarded by CARE is not recognized by the Bangladesh Medical Dental Council. Although the certificate is given from Dhaka University, registration as a doctor is not given due to lack of approval. The college was blacklisted by the Ministry of Health and Planning of Bangladesh and a ban on admission was imposed.

This was the first institute of assisted reproduction in the country that is equipped with the technologies required for in vitro fertilization (IVF). Triplets Heera, Moni, and Mukta, born at the centre on 30 May 2001, were the country's first IVF babies.

History 
CARe Medical College was established in 2014. The founder principal was late professor Dr. M Moazzam Hossain and the governing body chairman is Professor Dr. Parveen Fatima.

CARe Specialized Hospital was renamed as CARe Medical College Hospital.

CARe IVF started its journey as Centre for Assisted Reproduction, in November 1999 at Shaymoli.

The first batch of patients comprised 26 couples. 11 conceived on 30 May 2001. Heera, Moni and Mukta were the first IVF babies of Bangladesh. On 20 June 2001 the first Intracytplasmic Sperm Injection baby of Bangladesh was born. The 100th ICSI baby was born on 9 June 2004. By 2008 CARe IVF had successfully delivered more than 500 babies.

Founders 

 Founder Principal Professor Dr. M Moazzam Hossain MBBS, FCPS, FRCP (Edin)

 Professor Dr. Parveen Fatima MBBS, FCPS (Obst & Gynae)

Services 

CARe IVF operates on the third floor of CARe Hospital.

CARe IVF provides the most modern treatments for infertility, pertaining to international health guidelines. It expanded into the field of maternal and child healthcare. These services include maternal health checkups, counselling, child vaccinations and social awareness education about perinatal disease.

See also
 List of medical colleges in Bangladesh

References

Medical colleges in Bangladesh
Universities and colleges in Dhaka
Hospitals in Dhaka
Educational institutions established in 2014
2014 establishments in Bangladesh